Phryneta ephippiata is a species of beetle in the family Cerambycidae. It was described by Francis Polkinghorne Pascoe in 1864. It is known from South Africa and Namibia.

References

Phrynetini
Beetles described in 1864